The Real Academia de Bellas Artes de Santa Isabel de Hungría (Royal Academy of Fine Arts of Saint Isabel of Hungary) is located in the Casa-Palacio de los Pinelo in central Seville, Spain. It is divided into six sections: Architecture, Sculpture, Painting, Music, Archaeology, Decorative Arts and Performing and Audiovisual Arts.

It was founded in 1660. Notable members include; Ana María Vicent Zaragoza, José Hernández and Pepi Sánchez.

References

External links
—

Museums in Seville
Art museums and galleries in Spain
Decorative arts museums in Spain
Organisations based in Spain with royal patronage